The 1974 Iowa gubernatorial election was held on November 5, 1974. Incumbent Republican Robert D. Ray defeated Democratic nominee James Schaben with 58.07% of the vote.

Primary elections
Primary elections were held on June 4, 1974.

Democratic primary

Candidates
James Schaben, State Senator 
William J. Gannon, former State Representative
Clark Rasmussen, former State Representative

Results

Republican primary

Candidates
Robert D. Ray, incumbent Governor

Results

General election

Candidates
Major party candidates
Robert D. Ray, Republican
James Schaben, Democratic 

Other candidates
Ralph Scott, American

Results

References

1974
Iowa
Gubernatorial